James Ivan Ausman (born December 10, 1937) is an American neurosurgeon, science editor, television broadcaster, medical entrepreneur, and public advocate on health-care reform. He currently is professor of neurosurgery at the University of California, Los Angeles and editor-in-chief of Surgical Neurology International.

Biography
Ausman was born in Milwaukee on December 10, 1937, is married, and has two daughters. He attended Milwaukee County Day School, obtained a BSc degree from Tufts University in 1959, and graduated as an M.D. from Johns Hopkins Medical School three years later. In 1964 he received a Master's Degree in physiology at the State University of New York at Buffalo, after which he pursued surgery and neurosurgery training in Chicago and Minnesota. He then moved to the National Institutes of Health, receiving a PhD in pharmacology from George Washington University School of Medicine in 1969. He became a staff member at the University of Minnesota in 1972, eventually becoming an assistant professor of neurosurgery and pharmacology.

In 1978 he was named Chairman of the Department of Neurosurgery at Henry Ford Hospital in Detroit. At this time Ausman also became Secretary of The Society of Neurological Surgeons. In 1991, Ausman became professor and head of the Department of Neurosurgery at the University of Illinois at Chicago. There he expanded his work in microsurgery, cerebrovascular surgery, particularly aneurysms, arteriovenous malformations and by-passing cerebral ischemia. He has written and developed procedures for neuro-vascular surgery, novel approaches to the pineal region and midline tumors. He has over 200 publications and over 80 chapters in neurosurgical books to his credit. He is now a clinical professor of neurosurgery at the University of California at Los Angeles. Ausman has been called a "multitasker" due to his multiple endeavors.

Research
Ausman is the author of research articles published in medical journals. Frequent topics of these articles have been:

surgical aneurysm management
brain circulation microanatomy, anastomosis and revascularization
non-invasive monitoring of cerebral hemodynamics, blood gases and pH in surgical patients
cerebral arteriovenous malformations

Ausman is a pioneer in the field of revascularization techniques to improve cerebral blood flow, relieve cerebral ischemia, and treat cerebral infarction, and has contributed articles and chapter books on the subject.

Other research reports have referred to drug therapy of brain tumors, surgical anatomy of the optic nerve region, surgical approaches to the pineal region, management of midline tumors, nerve tissue ultrastructure, blood–brain barrier and pericyte-endothelial gap-junctions.

Editorships and Humanitarian ethics
Ausman was editor-in-chief of Surgical Neurology from 1994 until 2009, when it ceased publication. In 2010, he became founding editor-in-chief of Surgical Neurology International. He travels frequently to Developed and Third World countries to advise, lecture on neurosurgical trends and techniques, and humanitarian missions teaching ethics. Ramsis F. Ghaly, M.D., a Christian author and fellow surgeon has written that Dr. Ausman taught him humanitarian principles central to medical ethics: "Patients come first... treat the patient as yourself...do not let yourself fall asleep until you are certain you have done everything for your patient." Ausman is an Honorary Member of the Brazilian, Argentinean, Chilean, and Peruvian Societies of Neurosurgery and a Corresponding Member of the German Society of Neurosurgery. Through his James I and Carolyn R. Ausman Educational Foundation, and his vehicle, Surgical Neurology International, Rancho Mirage, California, Ausman has recently expanded his humanitarian and educational mission, in particular highlighting the Venezuelan crisis.

Ausman organized at his expense a Surgical Neurology International webinar: SNI Neurosurgery World Education Summit that took place June 5 & 6, 2021. And on July 28 he participated in another webinar organized by the Asian Congress of Neurological Surgeons in which he gave the first lecture, "The Most Important Lesson I learned in Medicine." In this lecture, Ausman orated on the history of civilization, as it relates to medical practice. He expounded on the patient-doctor relationship based on the Hippocratic Oath that establishes doctors should "first do not harm," premium non-nocere and its corollary related to the individual-based ethics of Hippocrates, that the patient always come first —omni pro agroto ("all for the patient").  Ausman further asserted that truth is essential for peace and civilization and that All Lives Matter and that Truth Matters! These seminars have been provided online, worldwide, free to physicians and patients via his publication Surgical Neurology International.

Other Publications

Ausman has recently co-authored the book The China Virus – What is the Truth? with Russell L. Blaylock (ISBN 979-8522503246 self-published).

References

Living people
1937 births
American neurosurgeons
Medical journal editors
Johns Hopkins School of Medicine alumni
George Washington University School of Medicine & Health Sciences alumni
Tufts University alumni